Cedar-Isles-Dean is a neighborhood in the Calhoun-Isles community in Minneapolis. Its boundaries are the Kenilworth Lagoon and Lake of the Isles to the north and east, West Lake Street to the south, and France Avenue South to the west. Nearby neighborhoods include Bryn Mawr and Kenwood to the north, East Isles to the east, East Calhoun to the southwest, and West Calhoun to the south. To the west is the suburb of Saint Louis Park. The neighborhood, one of the most affluent in the city, takes its name from Cedar Lake, Lake of the Isles, and Dean Parkway.

The Frank Lloyd Wright-designed Frieda and Henry J. Neils House is located near Cedar Lake in this neighborhood.

References

External links
Minneapolis Neighborhood Profile - Cedar-Isles-Dean
Cedar-Isles-Dean Neighborhood Association

Neighborhoods in Minneapolis